Álvaro Tejero Sacristán (born 20 July 1996) is a Spanish professional footballer who plays for SD Eibar as a full back.

Club career
Born in Madrid, Tejero joined Real Madrid's youth setup in 2005, after starting it out at CU Collado Villalba. After progressing through its youth setup, he made his senior debut with the C-team in 2015, in Tercera División.

On 5 July 2015, Tejero was promoted to the reserves in Segunda División B by manager Zinedine Zidane. He made his debut for the B-team on 22 August, starting in a 5–1 home routing of CD Ebro.

Tejero made his first team debut on 2 December 2015, coming on as a late substitute for Pepe in a 3–1 Copa del Rey away win against Cádiz CF. Having been the team's only ever-present and missing only 12 minutes of action all season, he scored his first goal for Castilla on 6 February 2016, the game's only against Real Unión at the Estadio Alfredo Di Stefano.

Tejero made his La Liga debut on 26 April 2017, replacing Raphaël Varane in a 6–2 home routing of Deportivo de La Coruña. On 10 July of the following year, he was loaned to Segunda División side Albacete Balompié for one year.

On 26 June 2019, Tejero signed a five-year contract with SD Eibar in the top tier. On 5 October of the following year, after featuring sparingly, he was loaned to Real Zaragoza for the 2020–21 campaign.

References

External links
Real Madrid official profile

1996 births
Living people
Footballers from Madrid
Spanish footballers
Association football defenders
Segunda División B players
Tercera División players
Real Madrid C footballers
Real Madrid Castilla footballers
Real Madrid CF players
Albacete Balompié players
SD Eibar footballers
Real Zaragoza players